Trinamool Gana Parishad (Grassroot Peoples Association) was a political party in the Indian state of Assam.

History
TGP formed as a splinter group of Asom Gana Parishad in 2000. The party was led by Atul Bora, then Public Works Department Minister in the Prafulla Mahanta Cabinet. The party was allotted "Cup & Saucer" as election symbol.

General elections
In the state assembly elections of 2001 in Assam, TGP made an alliance with Bharatiya Janata Party.

In the Lok Sabha elections of 2004, TGP put up one candidate, Deben Dutta from Guwahati. Dutta received 14,933 votes (1.69% of total votes polled).

Leaders
Atul Bora
Deben Dutta
Pulakesh Barua

References

External links
The Hindu

Asom Gana Parishad
Defunct political parties in Assam
Political parties established in 2000
2000 establishments in Assam